A secondary organic aerosol (SOA) is a molecule produced via oxidation over several generations of a parent organic molecule. In contrast to primary organic aerosols, which are emitted directly from the biosphere, secondary organic aerosols are either formed via homogeneous nucleation through the successive oxidation of gas-phase organic compounds, or through condensation on pre-existing particles. These gas-phase species exert high vapor pressures, meaning they are volatile and stable in the gas-phase. Upon oxidation, the increased polarity, and thus reduced volatility, of the molecules results in a reduction of vapor pressure. After sufficient oxidation, the vapor pressure is sufficiently low that the gas-phase compound partitions into the solid-phase, producing secondary organic matter (the particle phase of secondary organic aerosol).

SOAs represent a significant proportion of aerosols contained in the troposphere.

A common misconception is that the aerosol refers to the solid phase of the compound, where in reality, by definition, it is the combination of the gas- and solid-phases which constitute the aerosol.

References

Bibliography 
 
 

Aerosols
Atmosphere of Earth
Atmospheric dynamics